Amaia Olabarrieta Elordui (born 28 July 1982) is a Spanish former footballer who played for Athletic Bilbao and the Spain national team. An anterior cruciate ligament injury sustained in March 2014 eventually brought about Olabarrieta's retirement from football in 2016.

Official international goals
 2011 World Cup qualification
 1 in Spain 5–1 Turkey
 2013 Euro qualification
 1 in Turkey 1–10 Spain

References

External links
Profile at Athletic Bilbao

1982 births
Living people
Spanish women's footballers
Spain women's international footballers
Footballers from the Basque Country (autonomous community)
Primera División (women) players
Athletic Club Femenino players
People from Greater Bilbao
Women's association football midfielders
Sportspeople from Biscay
21st-century Spanish women